Saad Mish'al Al-Harthi - also transliterated Sa'ad Al-Harthi -  is a Saudi Arabian former football striker who played for Saudi Premiership side Al-Nassr FC. He retired from playing football in 2013.

Career
While he is a regular first team member at his club, he has to battle for a spot on the Saudi Arabia national football team. Recently he was chosen as a first team player, along with Yasser Al-Qahtani. He is nicknamed The Arabian Raúl due to the similarities in both looks and playing style of the famous Spanish footballer Raúl.

On 14 March 2007, Al-Harthi was awarded the "Most promising Arab player" Award for 2006 given by the Lebanese Al-Hadth football magazine. 

He proved himself in the AFC Asian Cup by scoring the winning goal against Indonesia.

The 2007/2008 season has been a disappointing one for Saad, as he failed to score in numerous situations which could have led his team to victories multiple times. So far this season, he has been able to manage 7 goals, which is considered to be pretty bad for Saad, who has normally been able to score at least 15 times in a season.

International goals

Honours

Club
Al-Nassr
 Federation Cup: 2007–08

Al-Hilal
 Crown Prince Cup: 2011–12, 2012–13

International
Saudi Arabia
Islamic Solidarity Games: 2005
AFC Asian Cup: Runner-up 2007

References

Al-Amri, Mohammed. "الرئيس العام يسلم الحارثي جائزة أفضل لاعب عربي واعد", Al-Riyadh, March 14, 2007. Accessed March 26, 2007.

External links
 

Living people
Saudi Arabian footballers
Saudi Arabia international footballers
Ittihad FC players
Al Nassr FC players
Al Hilal SFC players
2006 FIFA World Cup players
2007 AFC Asian Cup players
Association football forwards
1984 births
Sportspeople from Riyadh
Saudi Arabian Sunni Muslims
Saudi Professional League players